Baulderstone, formerly Baulderstone Hornibrook, was an Australian construction company.

History

MR Hornibrook
In 1926, Manuel Hornibrook founded a construction company in Brisbane. Amongst its notable projects were the Story Bridge and William Jolly Bridge. In the 1970s, it built the Sydney Opera House.

AW Baulderstone
In 1946, Bert Baulderstone founded a construction company in South Australia. In 1984, Societe Auxiliaire d'Entreprises became a major shareholder in AW Baulderstone.

Baulderstone Hornibrook
In 1985 the two companies merged to form Baulderstone Hornibrook, with operations expanded overseas into Asia. In 1993 it was acquired by Bilfinger Berger. In October 2008 it was rebranded as Baulderstone. In December 2010 it was included in the sale of Bilfinger Berger Australia to Lendlease. The brand was retired in 2013 as part of a restructure of Lendlease's construction business units.

Major projects
Major projects undertaken included:

References

External links
Company website

Companies based in Sydney
Construction and civil engineering companies established in 1926
Construction and civil engineering companies of Australia
Lendlease
Australian companies established in 1926
2013 disestablishments in Australia